The Tennessee Volunteers college football team represents the University of Tennessee in the East Division of the Southeastern Conference (SEC). The Vols compete as part of the National Collegiate Athletic Association (NCAA) Division I Football Bowl Subdivision. The program has had 27 head coaches since its formation during the 1891 season. Josh Heupel started serving as the head coach in 2021.

The team has played 1,215 games over 118 seasons of Tennessee football. Prior to the 1899 season, the Volunteers did not have an official head coach while compiling a record of twelve wins and eleven losses between 1891 and 1898. Since 1899, 11 coaches have led the Volunteers  in postseason bowl games: Robert Neyland, John Barnhill, Bowden Wyatt, Doug Dickey, Bill Battle, Johnny Majors, Phillip Fulmer, Lane Kiffin, Derek Dooley, Butch Jones, and Josh Heupel. Five of those coaches also won conference championships: Zora G. Clevenger captured one as a member of the Southern Intercollegiate Athletic Association, Neyland captured two as a member of the Southern Conference and Neyland, Wyatt, Majors, and Fulmer won a combined twelve as a member of the SEC. During their tenures, Neyland and Fulmer each won national championships with the Volunteers.

Neyland is the leader in total number of seasons coached and games won, with 173 victories during his 21 years with the program. Barnhill has the highest winning percentage with .846. James DePree has the lowest winning percentage with .306. Of the 23 head coaches who have led the Volunteers, Neyland, Wyatt, Dickey, Majors, and Fulmer have been inducted into the College Football Hall of Fame in Atlanta, GA.

Key

Coaches

Notes

References 
General

 
 

Specific

Lists of college football head coaches

Tennessee Volunteers football coaches